Paula Ioan (born 1 April 1955 in Bucharest) is a Romanian former artistic gymnast. She competed at the 1972 Summer Olympics, where she tied for 46th in the Women's individual all-around.

References

External links

1955 births
Living people
Romanian female artistic gymnasts
Gymnasts at the 1972 Summer Olympics
Olympic gymnasts of Romania
Gymnasts from Bucharest